The 2014–15 Belmont Bruins men's basketball team represented Belmont University during the 2014–15 NCAA Division I men's basketball season. The Bruins, led by 29th year head coach Rick Byrd, played their home games at the Curb Event Center and were members of the Ohio Valley Conference in the East Division. They finished the season 22–11, 11–5 in OVC play to finish a tie for the East Division championship. They defeated Eastern Kentucky and Murray State to be champions of the Ohio Valley tournament. They received an automatic bid to the NCAA tournament where they lost in the second round to Virginia.

Roster

Schedule

|-
!colspan=9 style="background:#; color:white;"| Regular season

|-
!colspan=9 style="background:#; color:white;"| Ohio Valley tournament

|-
!colspan=9 style="background:#; color:white;"| NCAA tournament

References

Belmont Bruins men's basketball seasons
Belmont
Belmont